Abdurrahman Habil, PhD, (Arabic (عبد الرحمن هابيل;) is a lawyer and Libyan politician. He was named Minister of Culture and Civil Society on 22 November 2011 by Abdurrahim El-Keib.

External links 
 Interim Government Official website (Executive Office)
 
 Interim Government official website - Ministry/Minister of Culture
 Interim Government official website - Abdurrahman Habil's CV

References 

Government ministers of Libya
Libyan lawyers
Living people
Members of the National Transitional Council
Members of the Interim Government of Libya
People of the First Libyan Civil War
Libyan Sunni Muslims
University of Benghazi alumni
Indiana University alumni
People from Derna, Libya
Year of birth missing (living people)